Virginia City is a census-designated place (CDP) that is the county seat of Storey County, Nevada, and the largest community in the county. The city is a part of the Reno–Sparks Metropolitan Statistical Area.

Virginia City developed as a boomtown with the 1859 discovery of the Comstock Lode, the first major silver deposit discovery in the United States, with numerous mines opening. The population peaked in the mid-1870s, with an estimated 25,000 residents. The mines' output declined after 1878, and the population declined as a result. As of the 2020 Census, the population of Virginia City was 787.

History 

Peter O'Riley and Patrick McLaughlin are credited with the discovery of the Comstock Lode. Henry T. P. Comstock's name was associated with the discovery through his own machinations. According to folklore, James Fennimore, nicknamed Old Virginny Finney, christened the town when he tripped and broke a bottle of whiskey at a saloon entrance in the northern section of Gold Hill, soon to become Virginia City.

In another story, the Ophir Diggings were named in honor of Finney as he was "one of the first discoverers of that mining locality, and one of the most successful prospectors in that region". Finney "was the best judge of placer ground in Gold Canyon", locating the quartz footwall of the Ophir on 22 February 1858, the placers on Little Gold Hill on 28 January 1859, and the placers below Ophir in 1857.

After the discovery of the Comstock Lode in 1859, the town developed seemingly overnight on the eastern slopes of Mount Davidson, perched at a 6200-foot elevation. Below the town were dug intricate tunnels and shafts for silver mining. The Comstock Lode discovery and subsequent growth of Virginia City was unequaled by the history of other precious metal discoveries.

Virginia City's silver ore discoveries were not part of the California Gold Rush, which occurred 10 years before. At the time of the discovery of the Comstock Lode, silver was considered the monetary equal of gold, and all production was purchased by the federal government for use in coinage. In 1873, silver was demonetized by the government, in large part due to the flood of silver into international markets from the silver mines of Virginia City.

Technical problems plagued the early mining efforts, requiring the development of new mining technology to support the challenge. German engineer Philip Deidesheimer created a timbering system for mining tunnels called square sets, which enabled the retrieval of huge amounts of silver ore in a safe manner. Square set timbering, roots blowers, stamp mills, the Washoe Pan milling process, Cornish pumps, Burleigh machine drills, wire woven rope, miners' safety cages and the safety clutch for those cages; even the Sutro tunnel all had a place in supporting the exploitation of the rich ore body. As technological advancements, these were used many times over in later mining applications. In 1876 one observer reported that in Virginia City, "every activity has to do with the mining, transportation, or reduction of silver ore, or the melting and assaying of silver bullion." By 1876 Nevada produced over half of all the precious metals in the United States. The Comstock produced silver and gold ore valued at hundreds of thousands of dollars annually.  The wealth supported the Northern cause during the American Civil War and flooded the world monetary markets, resulting in economic changes.

Like many cities and towns in Nevada, Virginia City was a mining boomtown; it developed virtually overnight as a result of miners rushing to the Comstock Lode silver strike of 1859. But, Virginia City far surpassed all others for its peak of population, technological advancements developed there, and for providing the population base upon which Nevada qualified for statehood. The riches of the Comstock Lode inspired men to hunt for silver mines throughout Nevada and other parts of the American West.

Virginia City population increased from 4,000 in 1862 to over 15,000 in 1863. It fluctuated depending on mining output. US Census figures do not reflect all of these frequent changes. Nonetheless, Virginia City overnight became one of the largest cities in the American Southwest. For the 1880 United States census, Virginia City was even larger  than some of today's largest cities of the entire US, such as Phoenix, San Diego, Jacksonville, and even Dallas. The city included gas and sewer lines, the one hundred room International Hotel with elevator, three theatres, the Maguire Opera House, four churches, and three daily newspapers.  Many of the homes and buildings were made of brick.

With this center of wealth, many important local politicians and businessmen came from the mining camp. At its peak after the Big Bonanza of 1873 Virginia City had a population of over 25,000 residents and was called the richest city in the United States. Dominated by San Francisco moneyed interests, Virginia City was heralded as the sophisticated interior partner of San Francisco. "San Francisco on the coast and Virginia City inland" became the mantra of west coast Victorian entrepreneurs. Early Virginia City settlers were in large part the backwash from San Francisco and the California Gold Rush, ten years before. Mine owners who made a killing in the Comstock mines spent most of their wealth in San Francisco.

A San Francisco stock market existed for the exploitation of Comstock mining. The Bank of California financed building the financial district of San Francisco with money from the Comstock mines. The influence of the Comstock lode rejuvenated what was the ragged little town of 1860 San Francisco. "Nearly all the profits of the Comstock were invested in San Francisco real estate and in the erection of fine buildings." Thus, Virginia City built San Francisco. The Comstock's success, measured in values of the time period, totaled "about $400 million". Mining and its attraction of population was the economic factor that caused the separation of Nevada territory from Utah, and later justified and supported Nevada statehood.

The mining industry dominated Virginia City, making it an industrial center similar to those of the east coast. But the city retained some of its frontier flavor. The social history of the town has emphasized the high number of immigrants among its residents. Miners largely from Cornwall, England, where tin mines had been developed based on hard rock technology, flooded the Comstock. The new English immigrants were one of the largest ethnic groups. Many of the miners who came to the city were Cornish or Irish. In 1870, Asians were 7.6% of the population, primarily Chinese workers who settled in many western towns after they had completed construction of the transcontinental railroad. The Chinese filled niche markets, such as laundry workers and cooks.

Through time, the numerous independent Comstock mines became consolidated under ownership of large monopolies. A group called the Bank Crowd, dominated by William Sharon in Virginia City and William Ralston in San Francisco, financed the mines and mills of the Comstock until they had a virtual monopoly. By manipulating stock through rumors and false reports of mining wealth, some men made fortunes from the stocks of Virginia City's mines. When it appeared the Comstock Lode was finished, the city's population declined sharply, with ten thousand leaving in 1864 and 1865.  By the late 1860s, a group of Irish investors threatened the Bank Crowd's control. John Mackay and partner James Fair began as common miners, working their way up to management positions in the mines. By purchasing stock in the mines, they realized financial independence.  Their partners James Clair Flood and William S. O'Brien stayed in San Francisco and speculated in stock. The Irish Big Four (or Bonanza Kings), as the men were called, eventually controlled the Consolidated Virginia mine where the Big Bonanza was discovered in 1873. The next few years were some of the most profitable on the Comstock, as the Bank Crowd lost control to the Irish Big Four. Population reached 25,000 in 1875.

Mining operations were hindered by the extreme temperatures in the mines caused by natural hot springs. In winter the miners would snowshoe to the mines and then have to descend to work in high temperatures. These harsh conditions contributed to a low life expectancy, and earned miners the nickname of Hot Water Plugs. Adolph Sutro built the Sutro Tunnel to drain the hot spring waters to the valley below. But, by the time it was completed in 1879, the mines had substantially passed the intersection level, as their tunnels had been dug ever deeper. In 1879, the mines began to play out and the population fell to just under 11,000.

Great Fire of 1875
Between 1859 and 1875, Virginia City had numerous serious fires. The October 26, 1875, fire, dubbed the Great Fire, caused $12 million in damage.  "The spectacle beggars description; the world was on fire...a square mile of roaring flames."  When a church caught fire, Mackay was heard to say, "Damn the church! We can build another if we can keep the fire from going down these shafts." Though the Con. Virginia and Ophir hoisting works burned, the fire did not penetrate the Con. Virginia shaft and only reached 400 feet into the Ophir shaft. "Railroad car wheels were melted", "brick buildings went down like paper boxes", and two thousand were left homeless.

In ensuing months the city was rebuilt. A majority of the area now designated as the National Historic Landmark historic district dates to this later time period.  However, the bonanza period was at an end by 1880

Virginia City and Mark Twain

The writer and humorist Samuel Clemens, then a reporter on the local Territorial Enterprise newspaper first used the pen name Mark Twain in Virginia City in February 1863 Clemens lived in Virginia City and wrote for the Enterprise from fall 1862 until May 1864.  His departure was to avoid a duel with a local newspaper editor upset over Clemens' reporting. Clemens returned to the Comstock region twice on lecture tours, first in 1866 when he was mugged on the Divide. The muggers relieved Clemens of his watch and his money. The robbery turns out to have been a practical joke played on Clemens by his friends. He did not appreciate the joke, but he did retrieve his belongings—particularly his gold watch (worth $300), which had great sentimental value. Clemens' book Roughing It (1872) includes this and other anecdotes about the city. Clemens' second return occurred in 1868 at the time of the hanging of John Millian, who was convicted of murdering the well-liked madam Julia Bulette.

Climate
Virginia City has a hot-summer mediterranean climate (Csa) with warm to hot summers and cooler and rainier winters.

Economy
In the 21st century, Virginia City's economy is based on tourism. Many residents own and work at the shops in town that cater to tourists, while others seek jobs in the surrounding cities. Virginia City, a National Historic Landmark District, draws more than 2 million visitors per year. It has numerous historic properties that are separately listed on the National Register of Historic Places.

The tourism supports an eclectic assortment of fine and casual dining experiences. Many lodging properties offer options to tourists wanting to stay overnight. Several bed and breakfast facilities are based in restored historic homes including: the B Street House Bed and Breakfast, previously the Henry Piper House, which is listed on the National Register; Edith Palmer's Country Inn and Core Restaurant in the restored 1860s Cider factory; and the 1876 Cobb Mansion.

Arts and culture
Virginia City is home to many interpretive museums and sites, including the Silver Terrace Cemetery, the Fourth Ward School Museum, the Pioneer Cemetery, the Fireman's Museum, the Way It Was Museum, Piper's Opera House, the Police Officer's Museum, St. Mary's Art Center, and numerous exhibits in businesses throughout town. Virginia City also hosts many unique and authentic event celebrations including cook-offs, parades, and Civil War re-enactments.

Virginia City Hillclimb
There is an annual hillclimb that runs from Silver City to Virginia City via Highway 341 (a truck route) that is put on jointly between the Ferrari Club of America Pacific Region and the Northern California Shelby Club. As of 2013, the event is officially open to performance vehicles of all makes. The event was put on first by Road & Track and the Aston Martin Club, the following year the SCCA took the same route, and later it was picked up by the Ferrari Owners Club. Highway 342 is now the return route for cars that have completed their runs up Highway 341.

Museums and other points of interest

Virginia City retains an authentic historic character with board sidewalks, and numerous restored buildings dating to the 1860s and 1870s. Virginia City is home to many charming and informative museums. The Fourth Ward School Museum brings Comstock history to life in interactive displays, and a restored 1876 classroom. The four-story wooden school is the last one of this type left in the United States.

Among the attractions on C Street are the Bucket of Blood Saloon, the Delta Saloon with the Old Globe, the Bonanza Saloon with the Suicide Table, the Silver Queen, and the Red Dog Saloon, originally the 1875 Comstock House, located at 76 North C Street. The Red Dog Saloon gave many San Francisco rock musicians their start during the summer of 1965. Piper's Opera House occupies the corner of B and Union Streets and is open as a museum when not a host to shows and musical venues of many types. Piper's Corner Saloon was one of the longest continuously operating saloons of the nineteenth century.

Points of interest include the Comstock Historic Walking Trail, where hikers can view the Pioneer Cemetery, site of Julia Bulette's grave, the Combination Mine Shaft, and Sugarloaf Mountain. Other attractions include the Silver State Police Officers' Museum in the Storey County Courthouse, complete with jail cells from the 1870s; The Way It Was museum on Sutton and C Streets, the Fireman's Museum with authentic Victorian firefighting equipment on display, the Chollar Mine tour, Ponderosa Mine Tour, Silver Terrace Cemetery, Presbyterian Church dating to 1862, St. Mary's of the Mountain Catholic Church (c. 1876), St. Paul's Episcopal Church, and St. Mary's Art Center, offering lessons and retreats. Trolley tours, walking tours, Storey County Courthouse, Miner's Union Hall, Knights of Pythias Building, numerous historic shops and homes, the Old Washoe Club, and Miner's Park are other attractions.

Virginia City was declared a National Historic Landmark district in 1961, and has been carefully preserved to retain its historic character.

Also in Virginia City is the Silver Queen Hotel and Wedding Chapel, which is famous for its picture of a woman whose dress is made entirely of silver dollars. The hotel was built in 1876 and includes a saloon.

The historic 1864 Union Brewery and saloon on 28 North C Street, frequented by Mark Twain, has been restored and reopened.

Education
Virginia City has one elementary school (Hugh Gallagher Elementary School), one middle school (Virginia City Middle School), and one high school (Virginia City High School).

Infrastructure

Railway

The Virginia and Truckee Railroad's northern terminus is located at Virginia City. A project was started in 1972 to begin rebuilding one of the nation's "crookedest railroads". The portion of line that has been rebuilt so far stretches south to Carson City and through Gold Hill. The project ran the first steam engine from Carson City on September 5, 2009, and continues to provide tourist excursions between Carson City and Virginia City on weekends. Other trains are pulled by historic locomotives on weekdays between Virginia City and Gold Hill on 35-minute round trips.

Notable people

 Fred B. Balzar, 15th Governor of Nevada from 1927 to 1934; born in Virginia City
 Lucius Beebe, author, gourmand, photographer, railroad historian, journalist, and syndicated columnist
 Julia Bulette, English-born prostitute and proprietor of most renowned brothel
 Charles Clegg, author, photographer, and railroad historian
 Dan DeQuille, author, journalist, and humorist; wrote History of the Big Bonanza (1876) about the Comstock Lode
 James Graham Fair, mine owner, partner to John Mackay
 George Hearst, an early Superintendent of the Gould and Curry in 1860. Hearst made his first fortune at the Ophir mine on the Comstock Lode.
 Harold A. Henry, Los Angeles City Council president; born in Virginia City
 John Brayshaw Kaye, poet and politician; worked in the town in the 19th century
 Richard Kirman Sr., 17th Governor of Nevada from 1935 to 1939; born in Virginia City
 Ezra F. Kysor, architect in Virginia City from 1865 to 1868
 John William Mackay, richest mining millionaire from the Comstock Lode
 Albert A. Michelson, the first American to receive the Nobel Prize in Physics (1907); grew up in Virginia City where his father was a merchant
 Ferdinand Schulze, Prussian immigrant who became a member of the Wisconsin State Assembly
 W. H. C. Stephenson, early African American figure; founded Baptist church and advocated black suffrage
 W. Frank Stewart, silver mine operator and Nevada state senator from 1876 to 1880
 , Frenchwoman who operated a shop selling wines and liquors; arrested in San Francisco in 1871 for being dressed in male clothing
 Adolph Sutro, industrialist, San Francisco mayor
 "Professor" Jerry Thomas, legendary bartender, spent about a year (1864) either at the "famous" Delta Saloon or the Spalding Saloon on C Street (or both)
 Mark Twain, iconic author, journalist, and humorist; worked for the local newspaper; his novel Roughing It is set in and around Virginia City

In popular culture
 Author Louis L'Amour's novel Comstock Lode is set in Virginia City during the silver rush.
 Virginia City is near the site of the fictitious Ponderosa Ranch on the Western television drama Bonanza. As such, the show's characters made visits to the town regularly. The Virginia City depicted on Bonanza was located at RKO Forty Acres in Hollywood.
 It was the locale of the 1940 film Virginia City, set during the Civil War, and starring Errol Flynn.
 The city appears in the 1944 film The Adventures of Mark Twain.
 The city during its mining boom was the setting for most of the 1946 James M. Cain novel Past All Dishonor.
 Virginia City und die wahre Geschichte des Wilden Westens ("Virginia City and the True History of the Wild West"), directed by Elmar Bartlmae, is a 2007 German documentary film.
 "Darcy Farrow", a folk song written by Steve Gillette and Tom Campbell, mentions Virginia City and other places and landmarks in the area (including Yerington, the Carson Valley, and the Truckee River).  The most popular version was performed by John Denver.
 A significant portion of Julie Smith's 1987 novel Huckleberry Fiend, concerning the discovery of a lost section of the manuscript for Mark Twain's Adventures of Huckleberry Finn, takes place in Virginia City. The actual missing holograph was located only four years after publication.
 The 1973 Lucky Luke adventure L'Héritage de Rantanplan, created by Morris and Goscinny, is mainly set in Virginia City.

References

Sources

 
 
 
 
 
 
 
 
  Archived at The Library of Congress
  Archived at The Library of Congress

External links

 Virginia City Tourism Commission
 Three Historic Nevada Cities: Carson City, Reno, Virginia City, a National Park Service Discover Our Shared Heritage Travel Itinerary
 City-data.com
 Piper-Beebe House
 
 
 

 
County seats in Nevada
Census-designated places in Storey County, Nevada
Mining communities in Nevada
Reno, NV Metropolitan Statistical Area
History of Storey County, Nevada
1850s in Nevada
Populated places established in 1859
1859 establishments in Utah Territory
Boot Hill cemeteries